Marcelo Alexis Weigandt (born 11 January 2000) is an Argentine professional footballer who plays as a right-back for Boca Juniors.

Club career
Weigandt came through the youth ranks of Boca Juniors, having joined in 2007 from Club Villa Ideal. His breakthrough came during the 2018–19 Primera División campaign, as he was an unused substitute for league fixtures with Gimnasia y Esgrima and Newell's Old Boys. Gustavo Alfaro selected the defender for his senior debut in the Copa Argentina on 19 April 2019 versus Torneo Federal A's Estudiantes, he played the full duration of a 2–0 victory. He appeared again later that month in the Copa de la Superliga versus Godoy Cruz, as they won the round of sixteen first leg away from home.

After ten further appearances for Boca, including five in the Copa Libertadores, Weigandt was loaned out in 2020–21 to fellow Primera División side Gimnasia y Esgrima.

International career
Weigandt represented Argentina at the 2017 South American U-17 Championship in Chile, featuring against Venezuela and Paraguay as they were eliminated at the first group stage. He previously appeared at the 2015 South American U-15 Championship in Colombia, winning the bronze medal. Weigandt received a call-up from the U20s in March 2019. He subsequently received a place in Fernando Batista's squad for the 2019 FIFA U-20 World Cup in Poland. He appeared in matches with Portugal and South Korea as Argentina were eliminated at the round of sixteen.

Career statistics
.

Honours
Boca Juniors
Primera División: 2019–20, 2022
Copa Argentina: 2019–20
Copa de la Liga Profesional: 2022
Supercopa Argentina: 2018, 2022

References

External links

2000 births
Living people
Sportspeople from Avellaneda
Argentine people of German descent
Argentine footballers
Argentina youth international footballers
Argentina under-20 international footballers
Association football defenders
Argentine Primera División players
Boca Juniors footballers
Club de Gimnasia y Esgrima La Plata footballers